Victor Davis Hanson (born September 5, 1953) is an American commentator, classicist, and military historian. He has been a commentator on modern and ancient warfare and contemporary politics for The New York Times, Wall Street Journal, National Review, The Washington Times and other media outlets.

He is a professor emeritus of Classics at California State University, Fresno, the Martin and Illie Anderson Senior Fellow in classics and military history at the Hoover Institution, and visiting professor at Hillsdale College. Hanson was awarded the National Humanities Medal in 2007 by President George W. Bush, and was a presidential appointee in 2007–2008 on the American Battle Monuments Commission.

Biography
Hanson, a Protestant who is of Swedish and Welsh descent, grew up on his grandfather's raisin farm outside Selma, California in the San Joaquin Valley, and has worked there most of his life. His mother, Pauline Davis Hanson, was a lawyer and a California superior court and state appeals court justice, his father was a farmer, educator and junior college administrator. Along with his older brother Nels Hanson, a writer, and fraternal twin Alfred Hanson, a farmer and biologist, Hanson attended public schools and graduated from Selma High School. Hanson received his B.A. with highest honors in classics and general college honors, from Cowell College, at the University of California, Santa Cruz, in 1975 and his PhD in classics from Stanford University in 1980. He won the Raphael Demos scholarship at the College Year in Athens (1973–74) and was a regular member of the American School of Classical Studies, Athens, 1978–79.

His academic career ran from 1985, when he was hired at California State University, Fresno to launch a classical studies program, to 2004, when he took early retirement in order to focus on his political writing and popular history.  In 1991, Hanson was awarded American Philological Association's Excellence in Teaching Award, given annually to the nation's top undergraduate teachers of Greek and Latin. He was named distinguished alumnus of the year for 2006 at University of California, Santa Cruz. He has been a visiting professor of classics at Stanford University in California (1991–92), a National Endowment for the Humanities fellow at the Center for Advanced Studies in the Behavioral Sciences, Stanford, California (1992–93), awarded an Alexander Onassis traveling fellowship to Greece (1999), as well as Nimitz Fellow at University of California, Berkeley, (2006) and held the visiting Shifrin Chair of Military History at the U.S. Naval Academy, Annapolis, Maryland (2002–03).

After taking early retirement from CSU Fresno in 2004, Hanson has held a series of positions in ideologically-oriented institutions and private foundations.  He was appointed Fellow in California Studies at the Claremont Institute, a conservative think-tank in California, in 2002. Hanson was appointed Senior Fellow at the Hoover Institution, another conservative think-tank in California.  He was often the William Simon visiting professor at the School of Public Policy at Pepperdine University, a private Christian institution in California (2009–15), and was awarded in 2015 an Honorary Doctorate of Laws from the graduate school at Pepperdine. He gave the Wriston Lecture in 2004 for the Manhattan Institute whose mission is to 'develop and disseminate new ideas that foster greater economic choice and individual responsibility'.  He has been a board member of the Bradley Foundation since 2015, and served on the HF Guggenheim Foundation board for over a decade. 

Since 2004, Hanson has written a weekly column syndicated by Tribune Content Agency, as well as a weekly column for National Review Online since 2001, and has not missed a weekly column for either venue since he began.  He has been published in The New York Times, Wall Street Journal, The Times Literary Supplement, The Daily Telegraph, American Heritage, and The New Criterion, among other publications. He was awarded the National Humanities Medal (2007) by President George W. Bush, as well as the Eric Breindel Prize for opinion journalism (2002), and the William F. Buckley Prize (2015). Hanson was awarded the Claremont Institute's Statesmanship Award at its annual Churchill Dinner, and the Bradley Prize from the Lynde and Harry Bradley Foundation in 2008.

Writing
Hanson's Warfare and Agriculture (Giardini 1983), his PhD thesis, argued that Greek warfare could not be understood apart from agrarian life in general, and suggested that the modern assumption that agriculture was irrevocably harmed during classical wars was vastly overestimated. The Western Way of War (Alfred Knopf 1989), for which John Keegan wrote the introduction, explored the combatants' experiences of ancient Greek battle and detailed the Hellenic foundations of later Western military practice.

The Other Greeks (The Free Press 1995) argued that the emergence of a unique middling agrarian class explains the ascendance of the Greek city-state, and its singular values of consensual government, sanctity of private property, civic militarism and individualism. In Fields Without Dreams (The Free Press 1996, winner of the Bay Area Book Reviewers Award) and The Land Was Everything (The Free Press 2000, a Los Angeles Times notable book of the year), Hanson lamented the decline of family farming and rural communities, and the loss of agrarian voices in American democracy. The Soul of Battle (The Free Press 1999) traced the careers of Epaminondas, the Theban liberator, William Tecumseh Sherman, and George S. Patton, in arguing that democratic warfare's strengths are best illustrated in short, intense and spirited marches to promote consensual rule, but bog down otherwise during long occupations or more conventional static battle.

In Mexifornia (Encounter 2003)—a personal memoir about growing up in rural California and an account of immigration from Mexico—Hanson predicted that illegal immigration would soon reach crisis proportions, unless legal, measured, and diverse immigration was restored, as well as the traditional melting-pot values of integration, assimilation, and intermarriage.

Ripples of Battle (Doubleday 2003) chronicled how the cauldron of battle affects combatants' later literary and artistic work, as its larger influence ripples for generations, affecting art, literature, culture, and government. In A War Like No Other (Random House 2005, a New York Times notable book of the year), a history of the Peloponnesian War, Hanson offered an alternative history, arranged by methods of fighting—triremes, hoplites, cavalry, sieges, etc.—in concluding that the conflict marked a brutal watershed event for the Greek city-states. The Savior Generals (Bloomsbury 2013) followed the careers of five great generals (Themistocles,  Sherman, Ridgway, de Gaulle, Petraeus) arguing that rare qualities in leadership emerge during hopeless predicaments that only rare individuals can salvage.

The End of Sparta (Bloomsbury 2011) is a novel about a small community of Thespian farmers who join the great march of Epaminondas (369/70 BC) into the heart of the Peloponnese to destroy Spartan hegemony, free the Messenian helots, and spread democracy in the Peloponnese.

Hanson has edited several collections of essays, including (Hoplites, Routledge 1991), Bonfire of the Humanities (with B. Thornton and J. Heath, ISI 2001), and Makers of Ancient Strategy (Princeton 2010), as well as a number of his own collected articles, such as An Autumn of War [2002 Anchor], Between War and Peace [Anchor 2004], and The Father of Us All [Bloomsbury 2010]. He has written chapters for works such as the Cambridge History of War, and the Cambridge History of Ancient Warfare.

Carnage and Culture
Hanson wrote the 2001 book Carnage and Culture (Doubleday), published in Great Britain and the Commonwealth countries as Why the West Has Won, in which he argued that the military dominance of Western civilization, beginning with the ancient Greeks, results from certain fundamental aspects of Western culture, such as consensual government, a tradition of self-critique, secular rationalism, religious tolerance, individual freedom, free expression, free markets, and individualism. Hanson's emphasis on cultural exception rejects racial explanations for Western military preeminence and disagrees as well with environmental or geographical determinist explanations such as those put forth by Jared Diamond in Guns, Germs, and Steel (1997).

American military officer Robert L. Bateman, in a 2007 article on the Media Matters for America website, criticized Hanson's thesis, arguing that Hanson's point about Western armies preferring to seek out a decisive battle of annihilation is rebutted by the Second Punic War, in which Roman attempts to annihilate the Carthaginians instead led to the Carthaginians annihilating the Romans at the Battle of Cannae. Bateman argued that Hanson was wrong about Western armies' common preferences in seeking out a battle of annihilation, arguing that the Romans only defeated the Carthaginians via the Fabian Strategy of keeping their armies in being and not engaging Hannibal in battle. In his first response, Hanson argued that Bateman was engaged in a "puerile, politically correct" attack on him, and of being motivated by current left-wing politics rather than a genuine interest in history. In a second response, Hanson called Bateman's use of personal, adolescent invectives such as "pervert", "feces", and "devil", as unprofessional and "unhinged", and had no role in scholarly disagreements, accusing Bateman of being poorly informed of history and geography, as well as engaging in conduct unbecoming a U.S. Army officer. Hanson declared that Bateman was incorrect about the Battle of Yarmouk, arguing that the Golan Heights were at the edge of the Eastern Roman Empire, instead of being in the center as Bateman argued, and claimed that the Romans lost because of divided leadership rather than as a result of superior Islamic generalship, as Bateman had contended.

United States education and classical studies
Hanson co-authored the book Who Killed Homer? The Demise of Classical Education and the Recovery of Greek Wisdom with John Heath in 1998. The book explores the issue of how classical education has declined in the US and what might be done to restore it to its former prominence. This is important, according to Hanson and Heath, because knowledge of the classical Greeks and Romans is necessary to fully understand Western culture. To begin a discussion along these lines the authors state, "The answer to why the world is becoming Westernized goes all the way back to the wisdom of the Greeks—reason enough why we must not abandon the study of our heritage".

Political scientist Francis Fukuyama, reviewing Who Killed Homer? favorably in Foreign Affairs, wrote that "[t]he great thinkers of the Western tradition—from Hobbes, Burke, and Hegel to Weber and Nietzsche (who was trained as a classical philologist)—were so thoroughly steeped in Greek thought that they scarcely needed to refer back to original texts for quotations. This tradition has come under fire from two camps, one postmodernist that seeks to deconstruct the classics on the grounds of gender, race, and class, and the other pragmatic and career-minded that asks what value the classics have in a computer-driven society. The authors' defense of a traditionalist approach to the classics is worthy."

Classicists Victoria Cech and Joy Connolly have found Who Killed Homer? to have considerable pitfalls. Reviews of the book have noted several problems with the authors' perception of classical culture. According to Cech, Director of Grants & Program Development, "[o]ne example is the relation of the individual to the state and the 'freedom' of belief or of inquiry in each. Socrates and Jesus were put to death by their respective states for articulating inconvenient doctrines. In Sparta, where the population of citizens (male) were carefully socialized in a military system, no one seems to have differed from the majority enough to merit the death penalty. But these differences are not sorted out by the authors, for their mission is to build an ideal structure of classical attitudes by which to reveal our comparative flaws, and their point is more what is wrong with us than what was right with Athens. I contend that Hanson and Heath are actually comparing modern academia not to the ancient seminal cultures but to the myth that arose about them over the last couple of millennia." According to Connolly, Professor of Classics at New York University, "[t]hroughout history, the authors say, women have never enjoyed equal rights and responsibilities. At least in Greece, 'the veiled, mutilated, and secluded were not the norm' (p. 57). Why waste time, then, as feminist scholarship does, 'merely demarcating the exact nature of the sexism of the Greeks and the West' (p. 102)? From their point of view, in fact, the real legacy of feminism is the destruction of the values of family and community."

Political views
Hanson was at one point a registered member of the Democratic Party but is a conservative who voted for George W. Bush in the 2000 and 2004 elections.As of 2020, he is a registered independent. He defended George W. Bush and his policies, especially the Iraq War. He vocally supported Bush's Secretary of Defense Donald Rumsfeld, describing him as "a rare sort of secretary of the caliber of George Marshall" and a "proud and honest-speaking visionary" whose "hard work and insight are bringing us ever closer to victory".

Hanson is a supporter of Donald Trump, authoring a 2019 book called The Case for Trump. Trump praised the book, in which Hanson defends Trump's insults and incendiary language as "uncouth authenticity", and praises Trump for "an uncanny ability to troll and create hysteria among his media and political critics."

Conservative views
He has been described as a conservative by some commentators for his views on the Iraq War, and has stated, "I came to support neocon approaches first in the wars against the Taliban and Saddam, largely because I saw little alternative." Hanson's 2002 volume An Autumn of War called for going to war "hard, long, without guilt, apology or respite until our enemies are no more." In the context of the Iraq War, Hanson wrote, "In an era of the greatest affluence and security in the history of civilization, the real question before us remains whether the United States – indeed any Western democracy — still possesses the moral clarity to identify evil as evil, and then the uncontested will to marshal every available resource to fight and eradicate it."

Race relations
In July 2013, then-Attorney General Eric Holder gave a speech where he mentioned that as a black man he needed to deliver "the Talk" to his son, instructing him how to interact with police as a young black man. In response to Holder's speech, Hanson wrote a column titled "Facing Facts about Race" where he offered his own version of "the Talk", namely the need to inform his children to be careful of young black men when venturing into the inner city, who Hanson argued were statistically more likely to commit violent crimes than young men of other races, and that therefore it was understandable for the police to focus on them. Ta-Nehisi Coates of The Atlantic described Hanson's column as "stupid advice": "in any other context we would automatically recognize this 'talk' as stupid advice. If I were to tell you that I only employ Asian-Americans to do my taxes because 'Asian-Americans do better on the Math SAT', you would not simply question my sensitivity, but my mental faculties."

American journalist Arthur Stern called "Facing Facts About Race" an "inflammatory" column based upon crime statistics that Hanson never cited, writing: "His presentation of this controversial opinion as undeniable fact without exhaustive statistical proof is undeniably racist." Anglo-American journalist Kelefa Sanneh, in response to "Facing Facts About Race", wrote "It's strange, then, to read Hanson writing as if the fear of violent crime were mainly a "white or Asian" problem, about which African-Americans might be uninformed, or unconcerned – as if African-American parents weren't already giving their children more detailed and nuanced versions of Hanson's "sermon", sharing his earnest and absurd hope that the right words might keep trouble at bay." Hanson, in response to Sanneh's essay, accused him of a "McCarthyite character assassination" and "infantile, if not racialist, logic".

Obama criticism
Hanson was a critic of President Barack Obama. He criticized the Obama administration for appeasing Iran and Russia, and blamed Obama for the outbreak of the war in Ukraine in 2014. In May 2016, Hanson argued that Obama failed to maintain a credible threat of deterrence, and that "the next few months may prove the most dangerous since World War II."

Works
 Warfare and Agriculture in Classical Greece. University of California Press, 1983. . Rev. ed. 1998.
 The Western Way of War: Infantry Battle in Classical Greece. Alfred A. Knopf, 1989.  2nd. ed. 2000. 
 Hoplites: The Classical Greek Battle Experience, editor, Routledge, 1991. 
 The Other Greeks: The Family Farm and the Agrarian Roots of Western Civilization, Free Press, 1995. 
 Fields Without Dreams: Defending the Agrarian Idea, Free Press, 1996.  
 Who Killed Homer?: The Demise of Classical Education and the Recovery of Greek Wisdom, with John Heath, Encounter Books, 1998. 
 The Soul of Battle: From Ancient Times to the Present Day, How Three Great Liberators Vanquished Tyranny, Free Press, 1999. 
 The Wars of the Ancient Greeks: And the Invention of Western Military Culture, Cassell, 1999. 
 The Land Was Everything: Letters from an American Farmer, Free Press, 2000. 
 Bonfire of the Humanities: Rescuing the Classics in an Impoverished Age, with John Heath and Bruce S. Thornton, ISI Books, 2001. 
 Carnage and Culture: Landmark Battles in the Rise of Western Power, Doubleday, 2001. 
 Published in the UK as Why the West Has Won: Carnage and Culture from Salamis to Vietnam, Faber, 2001. 
 An Autumn of War: What America Learned from September 11 and the War on Terrorism, Anchor Books, 2002.  A collection of essays, mostly from National Review, covering events occurring between September 11, 2001, and January 2002
 Mexifornia: A State of Becoming, Encounter Books, 2003. 
 Ripples of Battle: How Wars Fought Long Ago Still Determine How We Fight, How We Live, and How We Think, Doubleday, 2003. 
 Between War and Peace: Lessons from Afghanistan and Iraq, Random House, 2004. . A collection of essays, mostly from National Review, covering events occurring between January 2002 and July 2003
 A War Like No Other: How the Athenians and Spartans Fought the Peloponnesian War, Random House, 2005. 
 The Father of Us All: War and History, Ancient and Modern, Bloomsbury Press, 2010. 
 The End of Sparta: A Novel, Bloomsbury Press, 2011. 
 The Savior Generals: How Five Great Commanders Saved Wars That Were Lost – From Ancient Greece to Iraq, Bloomsbury Press, 2013. 
 The Second World Wars: How the First Global Conflict Was Fought and Won, Basic Books, 2017. 
 The Case for Trump, Basic Books, 2019. 
 The Dying Citizen: How Progressive Elites, Tribalism, and Globalization Are Destroying the Idea of America, Basic Books, 2021.

References

External links

 Victor Davis Hanson's Private Papers – Hanson's website; carries columns and essays by Hanson and colleagues
 Hanson's National Review articles  – archive at National Review Online
 Hoover Institution bio
 

1953 births
Living people
20th-century American historians
American male non-fiction writers
21st-century American historians
21st-century American male writers
American columnists
American essayists
American military historians
American people of Swedish descent
American political writers
American Protestants
California State University, Fresno faculty
California Independents
Critics of postmodernism
Farmers from California
Hillsdale College faculty
Hoover Institution people
New Right (United States)
American male essayists
National Humanities Medal recipients
People from Fowler, California
Stanford University alumni
The Washington Times people
Theorists on Western civilization
University of California, Santa Cruz alumni
Writers from California
People from Selma, California
Manhattan Institute for Policy Research
American people of Welsh descent
Historians from California
20th-century American male writers